The Queen's Award for Enterprise: Innovation (Technology) (2001) was awarded on 20 April.

Recipients
The following organisations were awarded this year.
ACO Technologies Plc of Shefford, Bedfordshire for ACO KerbDrain - a combined kerbstone and drainage channel.
Aircom International of Redhill, Surrey for  ENTERPRISE integrated software solution designed for radio network engineering.
Aireshelta Ltd of Huddersfield, West Yorkshire for Aireshower portable decontamination unit.
Andel Limited of Huddersfield, West Yorkshire for Floodline 128 leak detection system.
BBC Research & Development of Tadworth, Surrey for Digital terrestrial television receiver demodulator chip.
Biomet Merck Ltd of Bridgend, Wales for Oxford Uni-compartmental Knee, Phase 3.
Bromcom Computers Plc of London SE26 for Wireless registration and reporting systems for schools and colleges.
Cooke Optics Limited of Thurmaston, Leicester for 35mm lenses for the film industry.
Debenhams plc - The Wedding Service of London W1 for Multi-channel wedding service, offering gift lists and planning services in-store, on-line or by telephone.
EME (Electro Medical Equipment) Ltd of Brighton, East Sussex for the provision of neonatal respiratory support.
Easysoft Limited of Wetherby for  Easysoft Data Access.
Feralco (UK) Ltd of Widnes, Cheshire for  Production of new treatment additive for wastewater and paper processing.
Fish Guidance Systems Ltd of Fawley, Hampshire for  Fish guidance system for prevention of fish kill at power stations.
Forticrete Roofing Products of Leighton Buzzard, for Bedfordshire Gemini concrete roof tile.
Geneva Technology Limited of Cambourne, Cambridge for Geneva customer billing software for telecommunications.
Hanovia Ltd of Slough, Berkshire for  SuperTOC lamp.
Joseph Heler Limited of Nantwich, Cheshire for Production of low fat cheese.
Innovision Research & Technology plc of Wokingham, Berkshire for Datalabel - innovative and low cost RF tag technology.
Jobserve Ltd of Tiptree, Essex for Job vacancy advertising by e-mail and website.
LSI Logic (Europe) Ltd of Bracknell, Berkshire for Digital terrestrial television receiver demodulator chip.
Land Rover - Gaydon Product Development Centre of Gaydon, Warwickshire for Hill descent control system for 4 x 4 vehicles.
Magiglo Ltd of Broadstairs, Kent for Design of gas fires.
Melles Griot Limited of Ely, Cambridgeshire for Design and manufacture of nanometric positioning equipment.
PAV Data Systems Ltd of Windermere, Cumbria for Wireless optical data transmission equipment.
Pfizer Limited of Sandwich, Kent for Sildenafil (Viagra) for the treatment of erectile dysfunction.
Polymer Reprocessors Limited of Knowsley, Merseyside for Mechanical compact disc recycling process.
Biosurgical Research Unit, Surgical Materials Testing Laboratory, Princess of Wales Hospital of Bridgend, Wales for LarvE sterile maggots of Lucilia sericata.
Process Systems Enterprise Limited of London W6 for gPROMS - advanced process modelling simulation software and optimisation and services.
QAS Systems Ltd of London SW4 for QuickAddress range of address management software.
Rotork Controls Ltd of Bath for Rotork IQ electric valve actuator.
Segnet Ltd of Wickford, Essex for RPM-S RF upstream cross-connect segmentation router for broadband multimedia services.
Silberline Ltd of Leven, Fife, Scotland for ‘Silvet’ metal pigment in novel granular form management.
Solvent Resource Management Limited of Morecambe, Lancashire for Processing and reclamation of containers of waste chemicals.
Sortex Limited of London E15 for Niagara: a machine for simultaneous colour and shape sorting of fruit and vegetables.
Titan Airways Limited of Stansted, Essex for Provision of immediate and short notice aircraft availability.
Tritech International Limited of Westhill, Aberdeenshire, for Scotland SeaKing range of networked subsea tools and sensors.
UPU Industries Ltd of Dromore, County Down, for Northern Ireland Bale crop conservation technologies.
Unitec Ceramics Ltd of Stafford for An yttria stabilised zirconia powder for automotive oxygen sensors.
Urbis Lighting Ltd of Basingstoke, Hampshire for The Sealsafe sealed beam street lighting optic.
VG Systems Ltd t/a Thermo VG Semicon of East Grinstead, West Sussex for Equipment for the manufacture of advanced semiconductor devices.
Vicon Motion Systems Limited of Oxford for Systems capturing the 3-dimensional motion of objects, particularly the human body.
Waterside Manufacturing Limited t/a Englands Safety Equipment of Harborne, Birmingham for Multi-purpose life saving equipment.

References

Queen's Award for Enterprise: Innovation (Technology)
2001 in the United Kingdom